Julius Owino (born 5 February 1976) is a Kenyan former footballer who played as a defender. He played for Kenya at international level.

Club career
Owino signed with Kenyan Premier League team Gor Mahia in 2003. He joined Kingfisher East Bengal FC of the I-League in 2007 before returning to Gor Mahia in 2009. He was dropped from the Gor Mahia squad in January 2012, but was given a role on the club's coaching staff.

International career
He made his debut for the Kenya national team in 2004. His first goal for the team came in a 2–1 victory over Mozambique in a 2010 FIFA World Cup qualifier on 20 June 2009. He was chosen as captain for a game against Uganda in 2010.

References

External links

1979 births
Living people
Kenyan footballers
Kenya international footballers
Kenyan expatriate footballers
Association football defenders
Gor Mahia F.C. players
East Bengal Club players
Expatriate footballers in India
Kenyan expatriate sportspeople in India
Calcutta Football League players